"If You Like It" is a song by Swedish DJ, producer, and remixer StoneBridge featuring fellow Swedish vocalist Elsa Li Jones. The single is the first number one for both artists in the United States, where it topped the Billboard Dance Club Songs in its 7 May 2016 issue.

Track listing
 Digital download 
 Digital download 
 Digital download 

If You Like It (feat. Elsa Li Jones) [StoneBridge Radio] 2:59
If You Like It (feat. Elsa Li Jones) [StoneBridge Club Mix] 4:44
If You Like It (feat. Elsa Li Jones) [StoneBridge Speed Queen Mix] 4:12
If You Like It (feat. Elsa Li Jones) [StoneBridge Dub] 4:30
If You Like It (feat. Elsa Li Jones) [Bojan Remix] 4:24
If You Like It (feat. Elsa Li Jones) [Evil Twin Remix] 4:35
If You Like It (feat. Elsa Li Jones) [Hybrid Heights Remix] 5:10
If You Like It (feat. Elsa Li Jones) [Serbsican Remix] 6:45

See also
 List of number-one dance singles of 2016 (U.S.)

References

External links
 

2016 songs
2016 singles
Deep house songs
Eurodance songs